Kasatka Bay, formerly known by its Japanese name , is a natural harbor at the central part of Iturup, Kuril Islands. It has been controlled by the Soviet Union since the Soviets annexed the Kuril Islands from Japan at the end of World War II, and is currently under the administration of the Russian Federation after the collapse of the Soviet Union.

On 26 November 1941, the Japanese Imperial Navy led 24 vessels with the six aircraft carriers from Hitokappu Bay towards Pearl Harbor, Hawaii to trigger the Pearl Harbor Attack on 7 December, which led the United States declaration of war upon Japan.

See also
Pearl Harbor Attack
Staging area
Soviet Pacific Fleet

References 

Iturup
Attack on Pearl Harbor
Imperial Japanese Navy
Installations of the Russian Navy
Bays of Sakhalin Oblast